California's 49th State Assembly district is one of 80 California State Assembly districts. It is currently represented by Democrat Mike Fong of Alhambra.

District profile 
The district encompasses the western San Gabriel Valley, with its western side abutting Los Angeles city limits.

Los Angeles County – 4.7%
 Alhambra
 Arcadia
 El Monte – 62.1%
 Montebello – 10.3%
 Monterey Park
 Rosemead
 San Gabriel
 San Marino
 South El Monte – 27.4%
 South Pasadena
 Temple City

Election results from statewide races

List of Assembly Members 
Due to redistricting, the 49th district has been moved around different parts of the state. The current iteration resulted from the 2011 redistricting by the California Citizens Redistricting Commission.

Election results 1992 - present

2022 (special)

2020

2018

2016

2014

2012

2010

2008

2006

2004

2002

2001 (special)

2000

1998

1996

1994

1992

See also 
 California State Assembly
 California State Assembly districts
 Districts in California

References

External links 
 District map from the California Citizens Redistricting Commission

49
Government of Los Angeles County, California
San Gabriel Valley
Alhambra, California
Arcadia, California
El Monte, California
Montebello, California
Monterey Park, California
Rosemead, California
San Gabriel, California
San Marino, California
Temple City, California